The Moses Ellis House is a historic house located at 283 Pleasant Street in Framingham, Massachusetts.

Description and history 
The -story wood-frame house was designed by local architect Alexander Rice Esty and built c. 1866 for Moses Ellis, a well-to-do local farmer. The house has a distinctive front facade, with a square projecting gable-end section from which a porte cochere protrudes. The gable of the projection has a nearly pedimented end, with an oval-arched window, a motif repeated in a slightly projecting gable on the house's right facade. In the early 20th century the house was home to a school for boys.

The house was listed on the National Register of Historic Places on November 29, 1983.

See also
National Register of Historic Places listings in Framingham, Massachusetts

References

Houses on the National Register of Historic Places in Middlesex County, Massachusetts
Buildings and structures in Framingham, Massachusetts
Houses completed in 1866
Italianate architecture in Massachusetts